Mesmer is a 1994 Austrian-Canadian-British-German biographical film directed by Roger Spottiswoode from a script by Dennis Potter. It stars Alan Rickman as Franz Anton Mesmer and depicts his radical new ways as a pioneering physician.

Plot

In 18th century Vienna, Franz Anton Mesmer believes he is able to heal patients by drawing out something unique from inside his patients.  However, the only ones who seem to have improvements are the young ladies he helps. His controversial methods and their consequences lead him to leave Vienna and head to Paris. However, once there, he takes advantage of his unique methods to provide entertainment, which he is censured for by other doctors.

Main cast

Details

The movie was released on videocassette by First Look and in Canada in 1994 by Cineplex Odeon and MCA. In 2000, the movie was released on DVD by Image Entertainment, but has been discontinued since. As of January 3, 2010, there have been no plans made to release a new DVD.

This movie was shot in Vienna, Austria with the interior shots filmed at Esterházy Palace in Fertõd, Hungary.

Mesmer was released in August 1994 in Canada, at the Montréal World Film Festival.

Quotes
Franz Anton Mesmer: (with sarcasm) "Professor Doctor Stoerk, can I help you at all? I deal with most derangements, sir."

Awards

External links

 

1994 films
1990s biographical drama films
American biographical drama films
Austrian biographical drama films
British biographical drama films
Canadian biographical drama films
English-language Austrian films
English-language Canadian films
English-language German films
Films directed by Roger Spottiswoode
Films with screenplays by Dennis Potter
Biographical films about physicians
Films set in the 1770s
Films set in the 1780s
Films set in Vienna
Films set in Paris
Films scored by Michael Nyman
1994 drama films
1990s English-language films
1990s American films
1990s Canadian films
1990s British films
Films about disability